Susan Guettel Cole is Professor Emerita at the University at Buffalo in the Department of Classics. She is known for her work on Ancient Greek Religion and gender.

Education 
Cole received her PhD from the University of Minnesota in 1975. Her doctoral thesis was entitled The Samothracian Mysteries and the Samothracian Gods: Initiates, Theoroi, and Worshippers.

Career 
After graduating, she became Assistant Professor of Classics and Associate Professor of History at the University of Illinois at Chicago. In 1991 she was a Fellow of the Institute of Humanities at UIC. She published Theoi Megaloi: The Cult of the Great Gods at Samothrace, based on her doctoral dissertation, in 1986. Her second book, Landscapes, Gender, and Ritual Space: The Ancient Greek Experience, came out in 2004. She has also worked on pigs in Ancient Greek culture.

In 1992 she joined the Department of Classics at the University at Buffalo, where she was Chair of the department from 1994 to 1995 and again 1998–2004.

Cole was chair of the Society for Classical Studies Committee for Professional Ethics in 1986. She was Directeur d’Etudes Associé at the Ecole Pratique des Hautes Études in 1990. In 1996-97 she was a Fellow of the National Humanities Center. She has also received fellowships from the American Council of Learned Societies, the Alexander von Humboldt Foundation, and the David and Lucile Packard Foundation, and a grant from the Baldy Center for Law and Social Policy.

Select publications 

 1980. "New Evidence for the Mysteries of Dionysos." Greek, Roman and Byzantine Studies 21.3: 223–238.
 1981. "Could Greek women read and write?" Women's Studies, 8(1-2), 
 1984. "Greek Sanctions against Sexual Assault." Classical Philology, 79(2), 97–113.
 1984. "The Social Function of Rituals of Maturation: The Koureion and the Arkteia." Zeitschrift Für Papyrologie Und Epigraphik, 55, 233–244.
 1984. "Male and Female in Greek Cult." Zeitschrift Für Papyrologie Und Epigraphik, 55, 231.
 1986. Theoi Megaloi: the cult of the great gods at Samothrace . Leiden: Brill. 
 2000. "Landscapes of Artemis." The Classical World 93.5 (2000): 471–81. 
 2004. Landscapes, Gender, and Ritual Space:The Ancient Greek Experience. Berkeley: University of California Press. 
 2008. "Ritual Texts for the Afterlife. Orpheus and the Bacchic Gold Tablets." The Journal of Hellenic Studies, 128, 221.
 2010. "Maenads." in The Oxford Encyclopedia of Ancient Greece and Rome.

References 

University of Minnesota alumni
University at Buffalo faculty
Women classical scholars
American classical scholars
20th-century American educators
21st-century American educators
University of Illinois Chicago faculty
Living people
1942 births